George Duncan Hastie McMillan, Jr. (born October 11, 1943) is an American Democratic politician who served as the 23rd lieutenant governor of Alabama from 1979 to 1983. In 1989 he founded the City Stages music festival in downtown Birmingham, Alabama.

Early life and education
McMillan was born in Greenville, Alabama, to George D. H. and Jean McMillan. He earned a Bachelor of Arts degree from Auburn University in 1966, and a Juris Doctor from the University of Virginia School of Law in 1969.

Political career
McMillan was elected to the Alabama House of Representatives and served for one term in 1973. He then served in the Alabama Senate from 1974 to 1978, also for one term. He was elected the Lieutenant Governor of Alabama in the election of November 7, 1978.

Gubernatorial campaign
McMillan ran in the Democratic gubernatorial primary election in 1982, but was beaten by former Governor George Wallace, coming in second place. A run-off election was held between McMillan and Wallace, which Wallace won, going on to win the general election against Republican Mayor Emory Folmar of Montgomery.

References

External links
 Biography  by the Alabama Department of Archives & History
 McMillan Mediation Official Site of George D. H. McMillan

Lieutenant Governors of Alabama
Auburn High School (Alabama) alumni
1943 births
Living people
People from Greenville, Alabama
Auburn University alumni
University of Virginia School of Law alumni
Democratic Party members of the Alabama House of Representatives
Democratic Party Alabama state senators